The 1997–98 Vyshcha Liha season was the 7th since its establishment. FC Dynamo Kyiv were the defending champions.

Teams

Promotions
Metalurh Donetsk, the champion of the 1996–97 Ukrainian First League  – (debut)
Metalurh Mariupol, the third-place runner-up of the 1996–97 Ukrainian First League  – (debut)

Renamed
 In a winter break Zirka-NIBAS Kirovohrad changed its name to Zirka Kirovohrad.

Location

Managers

Changes

League table

Results

Top goalscorers

See also
 1997–98 Persha Liha
 1997–98 Druha Liha
 1997–98 Ukrainian Cup

External links
ukrsoccerhistory.com - source of information

Ukrainian Premier League seasons
1997–98 in Ukrainian association football leagues
Ukra